Brandon Hall may refer to:
Brandon Micheal Hall, American actor
Brandon Hall (American football), American football coach
Bug Hall, American actor
Brandon Hall (Washington, Mississippi)
Brandon Hall (McMaster University)
Brandon Hall station
Brandon Hall (Miami University)
Brandon Hall School